The 13th Annual Helpmann Awards were held on 29 July 2013 at the Sydney Opera House, in Sydney. Administered by Live Performance Australia (LPA), accolades were handed out in 41 categories for achievements in theatre, musicals, opera, ballet, dance and concerts for productions shown between 1 March 2012 and 31 May 2013. The ceremony was broadcast live on Arena with Eddie Perfect and Christie Whelan-Browne hosting the event.

The nominations were announced by David Atkins, Christie Whelan-Browne, Chloe Dallimore, Sharon Millerchip, Catherine McClements, Simon Gallaher, Cameron Goodall, Rob Mills and Erika Heynatz on 23 June 2013. The Secret River received the most nominations with eleven including: Best Play, Best New Australian Work and Best Direction of a Play. King Kong, Legally Blonde and The Addams Family led the musical field with eight nominations each. Salome gained the most opera nominations with five, including Best Opera, and TERRAIN and Keep Everything were the most nominated dance works with four each.

Kylie Minogue and David Blenkinsop were the JC Williamson Award recipients, and Brian Stacey Memorial Trust was awarded to Carolyn Watson. White Night Melbourne was given the Best Special Event Award and a new prize was created for King Kong for Outstanding Theatrical Achievement.

Winners and nominees
In the following tables, winners are listed first and highlighted in boldface. The nominees are those which are listed below the winner and not in boldface.

Theatre

Musicals

Opera and Classical Music

Dance and Physical Theatre

Contemporary Music

Other

Industry

Special awards
The JC Williamson Award, awarded for one's life's work in Australia's live entertainment industry was given to Australian singer Kylie Minogue and arts philanthropist David Blenkinsop. Carolyn Watson received the Brian Stacey Award for emerging Australian conductors, and an additional $8000 prize. Victorian Major Events Company accepted the award for Best Special Event on behalf of the State Government of Victoria, for the White Night Melbourne festival. The award for Outstanding Theatrical Achievement was created by the Industry Awards Panel and Helpmann Awards Administration Committee for the "design, creation and operation of King Kong – the creature." The panel and administration felt that the "ground breaking Australian creation, the first of its kind in the world, was worthy of individual recognition."

Notes

References

External links
The official Helpmann Awards website

Helpmann Awards
Helpmann Awards
Helpmann Awards
Helpmann Awards
Helpmann Awards, 13th
Helpmann Awards